The Bausenberg is a cinder cone hill, in the East Eifel in the county of Ahrweiler in the German state of Rhineland-Palatinate.

Location 
The Bausenberg is located between Niederzissen immediately to the south and Waldorf to the north-northeast. To the east is the motorway junction of Niederzissen on the A61.

Description 
The area around the Bausenberg is a protected area, which was initially provisionally established by a regulation dated 27 August 1968. On 14 April 1981, the hill was officially declared a nature reserve by the regional government of Koblenz. The reserve has an area of 127 hectares and covers parts of the parishes of Niederzissen and Waldorf. Its purposes are to  preserve the cinder cone, including its northeasterly lava flow, due to its special geological significance and also to protect, for scientific reasons, rare plant species and communities as well as habitats for rare animals. Also on the Bausenberg is a well formed circular rampart which is part of the reserve.

References

External links 
 Rechtsverordnung über das Naturschutzgebiet „Bausenberg“ (Landkreis Ahrweiler) dated 14 April 1981 (pdf; 82 kB)
 Karte Landschaftsinformationssystem der Naturschutzverwaltung Rheinland-Pfalz
 Der Hufeisenkrater Bausenberg

Mountains and hills of Rhineland-Palatinate
Mountains and hills of the Eifel
Nature reserves in Rhineland-Palatinate
Cinder cones